David Engwicht (born 1950) is an urban planner who resides in Brisbane, Australia. He is a speaker on the topics of transportation, community, and creativity and has given lectures around the world. Engwicht attended Kingaroy State High School in Queensland, Australia. He played a role in creating the first neighborhood Pace Car Program in Boise, Idaho and is an advocate of shared space schemes. Engwicht is known for his contributions to traffic calming and is credited with inventing the walking bus, street reclamation, and the Universal Anchoring Device. In 2015, Engwicht gave a presentation titled "Add some magic to a public space near you" at TEDx Indianapolis.

Books

David Engwicht is the author of several books, including:

 Towards an eco-city: calming the traffic (1992) 
 Reclaiming our Cities and Towns: Better Living through Less Traffic (1993)
 The cultural planning handbook: an essential Australian guide (1995) 
 Street Reclaiming: Creating Livable Streets and Vibrant Communities (1999)
 Mental Speed Bumps: The smarter way to tame traffic (2005)

See also
 Shared space

References

External links

 Carbuster's Magazine which has a profile of David in Issue #37 (he is also mentioned in previous issues).

1950 births
Living people
Australian urban planners
DIY culture
People from Brisbane
Sustainable transport pioneers